Zonda Telecom is a Mexican telecommunications company founded in Guadalajara, Jalisco in 1968 as a television manufacturer.

This company has several manufacturing plants in the Guadalajara Metropolitan Area, which manufacture its own products as well as electronic products for other companies. This makes Zonda an OEM.

In 2002, Zonda Telecom entered the mobile phone market becoming the first Mexican company to design its own Mobile Phones. Zonda has also produced communications systems and communication subsystems and for the Mexican military.

Models
Below is a partial list of some of Zonda Telecoms mobile phone models.

References

External links
 

Manufacturing companies of Mexico
Mobile phone manufacturers
Consumer electronics brands
Companies based in Guadalajara, Jalisco
Electronics companies established in 1968
Mexican brands